Echchil Iravugal is a 1982 Indian Tamil-language film, directed by A. S. Prakasam, starring Roopa, Pratap Pothen, Raveendran and Vanitha Krishnachandran. It was released on 14 April 1982.

Plot

Cast 

Roopa
Pratap Pothen
Raveendran
Vanitha Krishnachandran
Chandrasekhar

Soundtrack 
The music was composed by Ilaiyaraaja.

References

External links 
 

1980s Tamil-language films
1982 films
Films scored by Ilaiyaraaja